Dardenne Township is an inactive township in St. Charles County, in the U.S. state of Missouri.

Dardenne Township most likely was erected in 1818, taking its name from Dardenne Creek.

References

Townships in Missouri
Townships in St. Charles County, Missouri